Hans Bangerter (10 June 1924 – 29 July 2022) was a Swiss football administrator who was the General Secretary of the UEFA from 1960 to 1989. Starting in 1989 he served as chairman of the board of the Euro-Sportring Foundation. As of June 2019, Bangerter was still attending the UEFA Congress and major UEFA competition finals. He died on 29 July 2022, aged 98.

References

1924 births
2022 deaths
People from the canton of Bern
UEFA officials